The Council of British International Schools (COBIS) serves British International Schools around the globe, representing over 450 Member Schools in 79 countries and over 150 Supporting Associate organisations.

Objectives
COBIS exists to serve, support and represent its member schools – their leaders, governors, staff and students by:
 test member schools with the British Government, educational bodies, and the corporate sector
 Providing effective professional development for senior leaders, governors, teachers and support staff
 Facilitating, coordinating and supporting professional networking opportunities for British International schools
 Providing access to information about trends and developments in UK education
 Promoting career opportunities within the global COBIS network
 Brokering a cost-effective consultancy service between schools and approved educational support service providers

Actions
COBIS hosts a range of conferences and professional development events for teachers, middle leaders, support staff throughout the year, plus an annual conference in London in May for school leaders and Governors. In addition to accessing high quality training COBIS events provide excellent opportunities for colleagues to develop professional networks and contacts. COBIS represents its members with the British Government, educational bodies, the corporate sector and Ministries of Education worldwide and is committed to advancing the interests of British schools and British education overseas.

The Patron's Accreditation and Compliance
In October 2016, COBIS announced a new external validation scheme for British schools overseas to be known as The Patron's Accreditation and Compliance.  The new scheme will officially be available to schools from April 2017 and will be offered as an alternative to inspections carried out by the Department for Education for British Schools Overseas.

Structure
Founded over 30 years ago, COBIS is governed by an elected executive committee consisting of headteachers and governors from member schools worldwide. The association is a constituent member of the Independent Schools Council and operates on a not-for-profit basis to reflect being a UK-registered company 'Limited by Guarantee'.

The chairman is Mr Trevor Rowell.

COBIS is led by CEO Colin Bell and supported by the COBIS team based in London. In August 2015, COBIS head office moved from Twickenham to Russell Square in London's Bloomsbury area.

References

External links

Educational organisations based in the United Kingdom
International school associations
Private and independent school organizations